Bolotana is a comune (municipality) in the Province of Nuoro in the Italian region Sardinia, located about  north of Cagliari and about  west of Nuoro.

Bolotana borders the following municipalities: Bonorva, Bortigali, Illorai, Lei, Macomer, Noragugume, Orani, Ottana, Silanus.

References

External links

 Official website

Cities and towns in Sardinia